Pier Pressure is a music festival held in Gothenburg, Sweden. The first festival was held in 2007 and sold over 18,000 tickets.

With two stages and a close-up stage, 2007 Pier Pressure hosted 21 bands, mostly from Sweden.

Artists
In 2007, Pier Pressure hosted:
My Chemical Romance
Avril Lavigne
Billy Talent
CKY
Less Than Jake
Gogol Bordello
Enter Shikari
Sunrise Avenue
Finley
The Sounds
Sugarplum Fairy
Mando Diao
Loving Chokes
Blindside
Sounds Like Violence
April Divine
Neverstore
Kid Down
Chemical Vocation
Early To Bed
Tony Clifton

External links
 

Rock festivals in Sweden
Music in Gothenburg
Music festivals established in 2007